MSTS may refer to:

 Military Sea Transportation Service, the pre-1970 name for the Military Sealift Command of the U.S. Navy 
 Microsoft Train Simulator, a 2001 train simulator developed for Microsoft Windows

See also
 MST (disambiguation)